Mustafe Mohamoud Ali Bile is a Somali politician, who is currently serving as the Minister of Justice of Somaliland.

See also

 Ministry of Justice (Somaliland)
 Politics of Somaliland
 List of Somaliland politicians

References

Peace, Unity, and Development Party politicians
Living people
Government ministers of Somaliland
Year of birth missing (living people)